Isabel Emilia Edvardsson (born 22 June 1982) is a Swedish dancer.

Early life
She was born in Gothenburg (Göteborg).

Career
In 2007, she danced with the footballer Giovane Élber. She has taken part in Let's Dance on TV4 in 2011.

In Germany she has taken part in Let's Dance on RTL Television. In 2010 she took part as a judge.

Personal life
From 2003 to 2014 she lived in Braunschweig in Germany, since 2014 she lives in Hamburg with her husband, dancer Marcus Weiß. In 2017 she became mother of a son.

References

External links

Her dancing history

1982 births
People from Braunschweig
People from Gothenburg
People from Lerum Municipality
Swedish female dancers
Swedish television personalities
Swedish women television presenters
Ich bin ein Star – Holt mich hier raus! participants
Living people